Leon Menkshi is an Albanian TV personality.

Menkshi presented the official votes from Albania in the Eurovision Song Contest from 2006 to 2011. His career in TV started in 1990, by being chosen to host the Albanian National Song Festival (which is now known as the national selection for Albania's entry into the Eurovision Song Contest, Festivali i Këngës) twice in a row in 1990 and 1991. Menkshi also hosted the national selection in Albania in 2004.

References

Albanian television presenters

Living people
Year of birth missing (living people)